Slovak Republic is a source, transit, and limited destination country for women and girls from Moldova, Ukraine, Bulgaria, the Balkans, the Baltics, and China trafficked to Germany, Austria, the Czech Republic, Switzerland, Sweden, Italy, the Netherlands, Spain, Portugal, Croatia, and Slovenia for the purpose of commercial sexual exploitation. Men from Vietnam were trafficked to Slovakia for the purpose of forced labor. Roma women and girls from Slovakia are trafficked internally for sexual exploitation. The Government of the Slovak Republic does not fully comply with the minimum standards for the elimination of trafficking; however, it is making significant efforts to do so. The government allocated $91,000 for anti-trafficking efforts in 2007, an increase from $60,000 in 2006. In February 2008, police began investigating the country’s first identified labor trafficking case involving eight Vietnamese nationals forced to work in a cigarette factory in Bratislava. The government also made efforts to improve victim identification and assistance referral. However, the number of victims assisted by government- funded programs decreased in 2007.

U.S. State Department's Office to Monitor and Combat Trafficking in Persons placed the country in "Tier 1"  in 2018, but in 2019 and 2020, it was listed as a "Tier 2".

Prosecution
The Government of the Slovak Republic demonstrated adequate law enforcement efforts during the reporting period. The Slovak Republic prohibits all forms of trafficking through Sections 179-181 of its criminal code, which prescribes penalties under the criminal code ranging from four to 25 years’ imprisonment. These penalties are sufficiently stringent and are commensurate with those prescribed for other grave crimes, such as rape. Police conducted 14 trafficking investigations in 2007, including one labor trafficking investigation, compared to 20 investigations in 2006. The government prosecuted 16 defendants in four cases, compared to 32 trafficking cases in 2006. Seven trafficking offenders were convicted during the reporting period, down from 18 convicted in 2006. Most convicted traffickers were given sentences of up to two years’ imprisonment; one trafficker was sentenced to seven months’ imprisonment. There were no official cases of high-level government officials involved in trafficking during the reporting period. The government extradited one person to Austria to face trafficking charges during the reporting period.

Protection
The government demonstrated modest efforts to assist and protect victims in 2007. The Ministry of the Interior funded a new NGO program which provided shelter and assistance to four victims. In 2006, government funding to NGOs aided 10 victims; an additional 43 victims were assisted by nongovernmental-funded programs. The Ministry of Interior published a training manual and provided victim identification, referral, and sensitivity training for 490 police officers. Police identified and referred 15 victims to NGOs for assistance during the reporting period. Victims are encouraged to participate in investigations and prosecutions; foreign victims who cooperate with law enforcement are permitted to remain in Slovakia and work for the duration of the investigation or trial.

Prevention
Slovakia demonstrated limited efforts to prevent trafficking during the reporting period. The Border and Alien Police monitored the border for evidence of trafficking. The government continued to operate a 38-bed shelter for unaccompanied minors who enter the country illegally, thus helping to prevent the trafficking of this vulnerable population. In 2007, the government allocated $22,000 to develop and implement future awareness campaigns to reduce the demand for commercial sex acts. The Ministry of Education approved the use of NGO-produced anti-trafficking materials in schools in 2007, and the Ministry of Labor and Social Affairs cooperated with NGOs in a series of training and trafficking awareness activities aimed at vulnerable population groups, including Roma populations. During the reporting period, the government published a brochure educating its nationals traveling to other EU countries for employment opportunities about the dangers of trafficking. Slovakia did not provide trafficking awareness training for deployed peacekeeping officials during the reporting period.

See also 
 Human rights in Slovakia
Human trafficking in Europe
 Crime in Slovakia
 Law enforcement in Slovakia
 Slovak mafia

References

Slovakia
Slovakia
Human rights abuses in Slovakia